Carlos Ernesto Zatarain González (born 21 August 1961) is a Mexican politician from the Sonora. He served as a federal deputy of the LX Legislature of the Mexican Congress representing Sonora. Before that, he was a local deputy in the LV Legislature of the Congress of Sonora from 1997 to 2000 and municipal president of Guaymas from 2003 to 2006.

References

1961 births
Living people
People from Guaymas
Politicians from Sonora
Municipal presidents in Sonora
Members of the Congress of Sonora
Institutional Revolutionary Party politicians
20th-century Mexican politicians
21st-century Mexican politicians
University of Guadalajara alumni
Deputies of the LX Legislature of Mexico
Members of the Chamber of Deputies (Mexico) for Sonora